Bhatt Kirat was a Brahmin bard in the court of Guru Arjan, whose eight hymns are present in Guru Granth Sahib, the holy book of Sikhs. The title Bhatt is given to learned Brahmins.

Early life
Bhai Kirat Bhatt (Birth name: Kirat Kaushish) was born, in Sultanpur Lodhi to Bhatt Bhika, whose ancestors settled their from Ladwa town near Kurukshetra City (Present day Haryana), in a Gaur Brahmin family (of Kaushish gotra) and He was brother of Bhatt Mathura.

Battle of Amritsar (1634)
Bhai Kirat being tired of Mughal oppression, joined the Sixth guru Guru Hargobind to fight against the Mughal empire. He contributed and fought Valiently in Battle of Amritsar and killed Lahore’s Subedar Murtza Khan but because of heavy injury and blood loss, He Attained Martyrdom on the battlefield.

References

Sikh Bhagats